Myiotabanus is a genus of horse flies in the family Tabanidae.

Species
Myiotabanus amazonicus Rafael & Ferreira, 2004
Myiotabanus muscoideus Hine, 1907
Myiotabanus sarcophagoides Lutz, 1928

References

Tabanidae
Brachycera genera
Diptera of South America
Diptera of North America
Taxa named by Adolfo Lutz